The Sharifate of Mecca or Emirate of Mecca was a state, non-sovereign for much of its existence, ruled by the Sharifs of Mecca. A sharif is a descendant of Hasan ibn Ali, Muhammad's grandson. In Western sources, the prince of Mecca was known as Grand Sherif, but Arabs have always used the appellation "Emir".

The Sharifate existed from about 967 to 1925. From 1201, the descendants of the Sharifian patriarch Qatada ruled over Mecca, Medina and the Hejaz in unbroken succession until 1925. Originally a Zaydi Shi'ite emirate, the Hasanid Sharifs converted to the Shafi'i rite of Sunni Islam in the late Mamluk or early Ottoman period. Their Husaynid kin who traditionally ruled over Medina professed Twelver (Imami) Shi'ism. Both the Hasanid sharifs in Mecca and Husayni emirs in Medina converted to Sunnism in the Mamluk period, however, Mamluk and Ottoman sources hint towards continued Shia sympathy from among the ruling Hasanids and Husaynids after their conversion to Sunnism.

Early history
Originally, the sharifs of the Hejaz had generally avoided involvement in public life. This situation changed in the second half of the 10th century, with the rise of the Qaramita sect. The Qaramita directed tribal raids towards Iraq, Syria and much of Arabia, interrupting the flux of pilgrims to Mecca. In 930, Qaramita raiders attacked Mecca, and stole the holy Black Stone from the Kaaba, gravely embarrassing the Abbasid caliph in Baghdad. Abu al-Misk Kafur, an Abbasid vassal and ruler of Egypt, persuaded the Qaramita to end their raids and return the Black Stone to Mecca in return for an annual tribute. As a measure to enhance the safety of the pilgrims he chose one of the sharifs of Hejaz, and installed him as emir of Mecca in about 964.

In 1012, the Emir of Mecca Abu'l-Futuh al-Hasan declared himself caliph, but he was persuaded to give up his title in the same year. The first Sulayhid ruler conquered the whole of Yemen in 1062, and proceeded northwards to occupy the Hejaz. For a time, they appointed the Emirs of Mecca. As Sunni power began to revive after 1058, the Meccan emirs maintained an ambiguous position between the Fatimids and the Seljuks of Isfahan. After Saladin overthrew the Fatimids in 1171, the Ayyubids aspired to establishing their sovereignty over Mecca. Their constant dynastic disputes, however, led to a period free of external interferences in the Hejaz.

In 1200 circa, a sharif by the name of Qatadah ibn Idris seized power and was recognised as Emir by the Ayyubid sultan. He became the first of a dynasty, the Banu Qatadah, that held the emirate until it was abolished in 1925. The Mamluks succeeded in taking over the Hejaz, and made it a regular province of their empire after 1350. Jeddah became a base of the Mamluks for their operations in the Red Sea and the Indian Ocean, leading it to replace Yanbu as the main maritime trade centre on the Hejaz coast. By playing off members of the sharifian house against one another, the Mamluks managed to achieve a high degree of control over the Hejaz.

Ottoman era

During the Ottoman period the Emirate was not hereditary, and owed its succession to direct nomination by the Ottoman Porte. A dual system of government existed over the Hejaz for much of this period. Ruling authority was shared between the Emir, a member of the ashraf or descendants of Muhammad, and the Ottoman wāli or governor. This system continued until the Arab Revolt of 1916. Apart from the Emirs of Mecca, Ottoman administration in the Hejaz was first at the hands of the Governor of Egypt and then the Governors of Jeddah. The Eyalet of Jeddah was later transformed into the Hejaz Vilayet, with a governor in Mecca.

For much of the 19th century, the northernmost place of the Emirate was Al-'Ula, while the southern limit was usually Al Lith, and sometimes Al Qunfudhah; to the east, it never stretched further than the Khaybar oasis. Mecca, Medina and Jeddah were its largest cities. Some of the population of these cities consisted of non-Arab Muslims, including Bukharis, Javanese, Indians, Afghans, and Central Asians.

Early period
The Hejaz region was formerly under the Mamluk Sultanate until its defeat and take over by the Ottomans in 1517. In the same year, Sharif Barakat of Mecca acknowledged the Ottoman Sultan as Caliph. When the Sharifs accepted Ottoman sovereignty, the Sultan confirmed them in their position as rulers of the Hejaz. Ottoman authority was only indirect, as the arrangement left real power with the Emir. The Sultan assumed the title of "Hâdimü’l-Haremeyni’ş-Şerifeyn", or Custodian of the Two Holy Cities.

In 1630, a flood swept Mecca, almost completely destroying the Kaaba. It had been restored by 1636. In 1680, about 100 people drowned in another flood in Mecca.

Initially, the Ottomans administered the Hejaz under the Eyalet of Egypt. The Emirs were appointed by the Sultan taking into consideration the choice of the sharifs, as well as the opinions of the walis of Egypt, Damascus and Jeddah (after it was established), as well as that of the qadi of Mecca. The emir of Mecca was always from the Hashemite clan of Muhammad. This situation was ended in 1803, when fundamentalist Wahhabis deposed the ruling Emir of Mecca, Sharif Ghalib.

Saudi invasion and Egyptian control

The Saudis started to be a threat on the Hejaz from the 1750s onwards. Subscribing to the Salafi-Wahhabi creed, the religious establishment of the Saudis rose as a religious movement in Dira’iyya in the Nejd in 1744-1745. Their doctrine found few sympathisers in the Hejaz, and the Mufti of Mecca pronounced them heretics. They were able to take the two holy cities in 1801. In 1803 the Wahhabis, led by Abdul-Aziz Al Saud, attacked Mecca. Sharif Ghalib fled to Jeddah, which was besieged shortly thereafter. Sharif Ghalib was sent back to Mecca as a Saudi vassal.

First Tosun Pasha led the army in 1811 and occupied Medina in 1812 and Mecca in 1813. After his death İbrahim Pasha, who had accompanied Mehmed Ali's personal visit to the Hejaz in 1814, took over after lagging success with repeated Saudi resistance and managed to push the Wahhabis back into the Nejd. Upon the news of the victory, Mahmud II appointed İbrahim Pasha governor of Jeddah and Habesh. He was the nominal ruler of Hejaz on behalf of the Ottomans from 1811 to 1840. The Wahhabis were ousted from the Hejaz in 1818, when Mehmed Ali Pasha, by then Governor of Egypt, was able to succeed in final victory. The Hejaz then fell under his domination. The 1840 Convention of London forced Mehmed Ali to pull out from the Hejaz.

Vilayet of Hejaz

After the Hejaz was restored to the Ottomans, the provincial administration was restructured, and it was organised as the Vilayet of Hejaz. This led to the creation of two parallel political and administrative bodies: the Emirate and the Vilayet. After the Governor started to reside in Mecca, the Vilayet in a way took the Emirate into its jurisdiction, leading to a situation of dual government.

The reform provided for the loss of the near-autonomy of the Emir, leading to a conflict between Emir and wali that lasted for the rest of the 19th century. Even then, the Emir of Mecca was not relegated to a position where he would be subordinate to the wali. The Emirs of Mecca continued to have a say in the administration of the Hejaz alongside the governors. The two had an uneasy parallel coexistence: while ruling over the same geography, they divided authority in a complex way, leading to a continuous negotiation, conflict or cooperation between them.

As early as the 1880s, there was talk of British occupation of the Hejaz with the support of the sharifs. The British also challenged the Sultan's caliphate by claiming that Britain should appoint the Emir, as it ruled over four times as many Muslims as the Ottomans.

Kingdom of the Hejaz

Hussein bin Ali, the Sharif and Emir of Mecca from 1908, enthroned himself as King of the Hejaz after proclaiming the Great Arab Revolt against the Ottoman Empire, and continued to hold both of the offices of Sharif and King from 1916 to 1924. At the end of his reign he also briefly laid claim to the office of Sharifian Caliph; he was a 37th-generation direct descendant of Muhammad, as he belongs to the Hashemite family. A member of the Dhawu Awn clan (Banu Hashim) from the Qatadid emirs of Mecca, he was perceived to have rebellious inclinations and in 1893 was summoned to Istanbul, where he was kept on the Council of State. In 1908, in the aftermath of the Young Turk Revolution, he was appointed Emir of Mecca by the Ottoman sultan Abdul Hamid II.

In 1916, with the promise of British support for Arab independence, he proclaimed the Great Arab Revolt against the Ottoman Empire, accusing the Committee of Union and Progress of violating tenets of Islam and limiting the power of the sultan-caliph. Shortly after the outbreak of the revolt, Hussein declared himself "King of the Arab Countries". However, his pan-Arab aspirations were not accepted by the Allies, who recognized him only as King of the Hejaz. The Kingdom of the Hejaz was proclaimed as an independent sovereign kingdom in June 1916 during the First World War, to be independent from the Ottoman Empire, on the basis of an alliance with the British Empire to drive the Ottoman Army away from the Arabian Peninsula during the Great Arab Revolt.

In the aftermath of World War I, Hussein refused to ratify the Treaty of Versailles, in protest at the Balfour Declaration and the establishment of British and French mandates in Syria, Iraq, and Palestine. He later refused to sign the Anglo-Hashemite Treaty and thus deprived himself of British support when his kingdom was attacked by Ibn Saud. After the Kingdom of Hejaz was invaded by the Al Saud-Wahhabi armies of the Ikhwan, on 23 December 1925 Ali ibn Husayn surrendered to the Saudis, bringing both the Kingdom of Hejaz and the Sharifate of Mecca to an end.

List of Sharifs

Partial list of Sharif of Mecca:

 Muhammad Abu'l-Ja'far al-Thalab (967–980)
 Isa ibn Ja'far (976/977–994)
 Abu'l-Futuh al-Hasan ibn Ja'far (994–1010)
 Shukr al-Din (1010–1012)
 Abu Tayeb Daoud bin Abdul Rahman (1012-1039)
 Muhammad ibn Abdul Rahman (1039-1048)
 Hamzah ibn Wahas (1058-1062)
 Abu Hashim Muhammad ibn Ja'far (1063 –1094)
 Qasim ibn Abi Hashim (1094 – 1123/24)
 Fulaytah ibn Qasim (1123/24 – Jun/Jul 1133)
 Hashim ibn Fulaytah (1133–1155)
 Qasim ibn Hashim (1155–1161)
 Isa ibn Fulaytah (1161 – Aug/Sep 1162)
 Qasim ibn Hashim (Aug/Sep 1162)
 Isa ibn Fulaytah (Aug/Sep 1162 – c. 30 Sep 1170)
 Malik ibn Fulaytah (? – ?)
 Isa ibn Fulaytah (c. 30 Sep 1170 – c. 5 March 1175)
 Da'ud ibn Isa (c. 5 Mar 1175 – c. 5 Feb 1176)
 Mukaththir ibn Isa (c. 5 Feb 1176 – c. 3 Jul 1176)
 Da'ud ibn Isa (Jul 1176 – 1176/77)
 Mukaththir ibn Isa (1176/77 – ?)
 Da'ud ibn Isa (? – 1191/92)
 Mukaththir ibn Isa (1191/92 – 1201)
 Qatada ibn Idris al-Alawi al-Hasani (1201–1220)
 Ibn Qatada al-Hashimi (1220–1241)
 al-Hassan abu'l-Sa'd (1241–1254)
 Muhammed Abu'l-Nubaj (1254–1301)
 Rumaitha Abu'l-Rada (1301–1346)
 Aljan Abu'l-Sarjah (1346–1375)
 Gap
 al-Hassan II (1394–1425)
 Barakat I (1425–1455)
 Malik al-Adil Muhammad (III) ibn Barakat (1455–1497)
 Barakat (II) ibn Muhammad (1497–1525)
 Muhammad Abu Numay (II) Nazim al-Din (1525–1583)
 Al-Hasan (III) ibn Muhammad Abu Numay (1583–1601)
 Idris (II) Abu 'Aun ibn Hasan (1601–1610)
 Muhsin (I) ibn Hussein (1610–1628)
 Ahmad ibn Abu Talib al-Hasan (1628–1629)
 Masud (I) ibn Idris (1629–1630)
 Abdullah (I) ibn Hasan (1630–1631)
 Zeid ibn Muhsin (1631–1666)
 Joint government of Saad ibn Zeid (1666–1672); Ahmad ibn Zeid (1669–1671); Muhsin ibn Ahmad (1667–1668); Hamud ibn Abdullah ibn Hasan (1670)
 Barakat (III) ibn Muhammad (1672–1682)
 Ibrahim ibn Muhammad (1682)
 Said (I) ibn Barakat (1682–1683)
 Ahmad ibn Zeid (1684–1688)
 Joint government of Ahmad ibn Ghalib (1688–1690) and Muhsin ibn Ahmad (1689–1690)
 Muhsin (II) ibn Hussein (1690–1691)
 Said (II) ibn Saad (1691–1694)
 Saad ibn Zeid (1693–1694)
 Abdullah (II) ibn Hashim (1694)
 Saad ibn Zeid (1694–1702)
 Said (II) ibn Saad (1702–1704)
 Abdul Muhsin ibn Ahmad (1704)
 Abdul Karim ibn Muhammad (1704–1705)
 Said (II) ibn Saad (1705)
 Abdul Karim ibn Muhammad (1705–1711)
 Said (II) ibn Saad (1711–1717)
 Abdullah (III) ibn Said (1717–1718)
 Ali ibn Said (1718)
 Yahya (I) ibn Barakat (1718–1719)
 Mubarak ibn Ahmad (1720–1722)
 Barakat ibn Yahya (1722–1723)
 Mubarak ibn Ahmad (1723–1724)
 Abdullah (III) ibn Said (1724–1731)
 Muhammad ibn Abdullah (1731–1732)
 Masud ibn Said (1732–1733)
 Muhammad ibn Abdullah (1733–1734)
 Masud ibn Said (1734–1752)
 Masaad ibn Said (II) (1752–1759)
 Jaafar ibn Said (1759–1760)
 Masaad ibn Said (II) (1760–1770)
 Ahmad ibn Said (1770)
 Abdullah (IV) ibn Hussein (1770–1773)
 Surur ibn Masaad (1773–1788)
 Abdul Muin ibn Masaad (1788)
 Ghalib ibn Masaad (1788–1803)
 Yahya (II) ibn Surur (1803–1813)
 Ghalib ibn Masaad (1813–1827)
 Abdul Mutalib ibn Ghalib (1827)
 Muhammad ibn Abdul Muin (1827–1836)
 Position vacant due to the rise of the Second Saudi State
 Muhammad ibn Abdul Muin (1840–1851)
 Abdul Mutalib ibn Ghalib (1851–1856)
 Muhammad ibn Abdul Muin (1856–1858)
 Abdullah Kamil Pasha ibn Muhammad (1858–1877)
 Hussein ibn Muhammad (1877–1880)
 Abdul Mutalib ibn Ghalib (1880–1882)
 Aun ar-Rafiq Pasha ibn Muhammad (1882–1905)
 Ali Pasha ibn Abdullah (1905–1908)
 Hussein Pasha ibn Ali (1908–1916)
 Ali Haidar Pasha (1916)
 Husayn ibn Ali (1916–1924)
 Ali ibn Husayn (1924-1925)

See also
 Sharif of Mecca
 Ottoman Arabia

Notes

References

External links
 Kingdoms of the Arabs - The Hashemites

 
History of Hejaz
Ikhshidid dynasty
Government of the Fatimid Caliphate
Sulayhid dynasty
Government of the Mamluk Sultanate
States and territories disestablished in 1925
States and territories established in the 960s
Vassal states of the Ottoman Empire
Converts to Sunni Islam from Shia Islam